Wang Qiang was the defending champion, having won the event in 2012, but she lost in the first round to Zhang Ling.

Zhang Shuai won the title, defeating Zhou Yimiao in the final, 6–2, 6–1.

Seeds

Main draw

Finals

Top half

Bottom half

References 
 Main draw

Beijing International Challenger - Women's Singles
2013 Women's Singles